The 1919 Kansas Jayhawks football team was an American football team that represented the University of Kansas in the Missouri Valley Conference (MVC) during the 1919 college football season. In their first and only season under head coach Leon McCarty, the Jayhawks compiled a 3–2–3 record (1–1–1 against conference opponents), finished in fourth place in the MVC, and outscored opponents by a total of 85 to 35. They played their home games at McCook Field in Lawrence, Kansas. Howard Laslett was the team captain.

Schedule

References

Kansas
Kansas Jayhawks football seasons
Kansas Jayhawks football